The Drum Suite (subtitled A Musical Portrait of Eight Arms from Six Angles) is an album by American jazz composers and arrangers Manny Albam and Ernie Wilkins featuring performances recorded in 1956 and first released on the RCA Victor label. The album was followed by Al Cohn's Son of Drum Suite (RCA Victor, 1960).

Reception

The AllMusic review stated "No doubt written to exploit the hi-fi craze in full swing during Ike's presidency, Manny Albams' and Ernie Wilkins' The Drum Suite took the unprecedented step of including parts for four drummers. Inevitably, Albams and Wilkins abandoned the anarchic idea of turning all four drummers loose at the same time; thus these six movements -- divided equally between the two composers -- feature carefully written-out parts for each drummer to follow. ...By keeping things free of gimmickry, Albams/Wilkins created a viable piece of music that, if truth be told, could have been performed acceptably by one drummer." and awarded the album 4 stars.

Track listing
All compositions by Ernie Wilkins except as indicated
 "First Movement: Dancers on Drums"  - 5:20 	
 "Second Movement: Bristling" (Manny Albam) - 5:22 	
 "Third Movement: Chant of the Witch Doctor" (Albam) - 6:30 	
 "Fourth Movement: Skinning the Valves" (Albam) - 6:05 	
 "Fifth Movement: Cymbalisms" - 7:35 	
 "Sixth Movement: The Octopus" - 6:00

Personnel
Manny Albam, Ernie Wilkins - arranger, conductor
Conte Candoli (tracks 3, 4 & 5), Joe Ferrante (track 4), Bernie Glow (track 4), Joe Newman (tracks 1-6), Ernie Royal (track 4) - trumpet
Jimmy O'Heigho (track 2), Urbie Green (track 3), Fred Ohms (track A3), Tommy Mitchell (track 3), Chauncey Welsch (track 3) - trombone
John Barrows, Jimmy Buffington - French horn (track 5)
Al Epstein - English horn (track 3) 
Ray Beckenstein - piccolo (track 3)  
Hal McKusick - alto saxophone (tracks 1, 2 & 4)
Al Cohn - tenor saxophone, clarinet (tracks 2, 3 & 6)
Gus Johnson, Osie Johnson, Don Lamond, Teddy Sommer – drums

References

RCA Records albums
Manny Albam albums
Ernie Wilkins albums
1956 albums